Murciélagos Fútbol Club is a Mexican football club that plays in the Liga Premier. The club is based in Los Mochis, Sinaloa. From its beginnings, the club had the aim to turn into a model for Mexican football.

History
Founded in 2008 and with headquarters in Sinaloa's "Region of the Évora", Murciélagos is property of Grupo Faharo.
Murciélagos FC broadcast their live games every Friday Nights at 10:00 pm central time in Mexico on the most interactive page of Internet of Mexican football 2 of Sinaloa are transmitted also by television opened by the channel.

On January 23, 2010 Murciélagos made history for being the first team in the world to allow its fans to vote through the Web for their starting lineup, supported by FIFA.
The game was won by  Murciélagos 1–0 to Vaqueros de Tepic of the premier league of the second division supervised by Juan Manuel Romo being the first coach that made history with this novel system and, at the same time, having the largest number of auxiliary technical personnel in the world.
In the electronic football called Juan Manuel Navarro was the first player that entered to the field under this novel method replacing Sergio Mejia in the change.

The club was originally based in Guamúchil, Sinaloa, but relocated to Los Mochis when it was announced on June 7, 2015, that they would participate in the second division, the Ascenso MX, after they bought the Irapuato franchise. After its relocation, the team remained in Ascenso MX until Torneo Clausura 2018, when it was relegated to Liga Premier de México due to poor sports results.

After two seasons, in 2020 the team decided to pause its participation in the Liga Premier as a result of the economic crisis derived from the coronavirus epidemic, in addition to the uncertainty of the board to continue participating in the competitions organized by the Mexican Football Federation due to the reform carried out in the Ascenso MX which was transformed into Liga de Expansión MX focused on the development of footballers over the promotion of teams to Liga MX. Unlike other clubs, Murcielagos did not clarify its future as of the 2021–22 season.

Stadium

Murciélagos FC play their home matches at the Estadio Centenario in Los Mochis, Sinaloa. The stadium capacity is 11,134 people. Its owned by Ayuntamiento de Ahome, and its surface is covered by natural grass. The stadium was opened in early 2003.

Current squad

Season to season

Managers
 Manuel Romo (April 2009–March 10)
 Manuel Flores (March 2010–July 11)
 Lorenzo López (July 2011–July 12)
 Rubén "Ratón" Ayala (July 2012–Nov 12)
 Roberto Sandoval (Nov 2012–Feb 13)
 Lorenzo López (2nd Term; Feb 2013–Sept 13)
 Cesilio de los Santos (2013–14)
 Roberto Castro (2014–15)
 Lorenzo López (3rd Term; June 2015–16)
 Jorge Manrique (2016)
 Adolfo Garcia (2016)
 Aldo Da Pozzo (2016–2017)
 Marco Antonio Figueroa (2017)
 Luis Mendoza (2017)
 Óscar Gil (2017–)

See also
Football in Mexico

References

External links
Official website (in Spanish)

Football clubs in Sinaloa
Association football clubs established in 2008
2008 establishments in Mexico
Ascenso MX teams
Los Mochis